North Miami Middle/High School is a combination middle and high school located in Miami County, Denver, Indiana, United States. The school is part of North Miami Community Schools.

Athletics
North Miami has won state championships in football (1993–94) and softball (2013-2014).

Notable alumni
Ruth Riley, former WNBA player
Ethan Manning, member of the Indiana House of Representatives

References

External links
School website
School district website

Public high schools in Indiana
Schools in Miami County, Indiana
Public middle schools in Indiana
1961 establishments in Indiana